IVB may refer to:
 IVB meteorites, a group of iron meteorites
 Innsbrucker Verkehrsbetriebe, which runs the public transport system in Innsbruck
 The British Virgin Islands.
 Intel 3rd Generation Core Ivy Bridge (microarchitecture)